Dead Air is an exclusive-to-audio Doctor Who story, produced as part of BBC Books' New Series Adventures line, and the seventh entry in the series to be produced. Written by author James Goss and read by David Tennant, it features the Tenth Doctor travelling alone. It is the Tenth Doctor's final story and was released on 4 March 2010.

Synopsis
A pirate radio station in the 1960s is threatened by an alien called the Hush, who kills everything that makes noise. The Doctor and the radio DJs try to trap the Hush before it devours the whole planet.

Release
Dead Air was first released in 2010. In May 2022, as part of Record Store Day UK 2022, the story was re-released on vinyl.

Reception
Dead Air was voted the "Best Audiobook of the Year 2010" by The Audiobook Store.

References

Audiobooks based on Doctor Who
Tenth Doctor audio plays
2010 audio plays
Works by James Goss
Fiction set in the 1960s
Pirate radio